Zsolt Borkai (born August 31, 1965) is a Hungarian Olympic gymnast champion and politician, who served as the mayor of Győr from 1 October 2006 to 8 November 2019. He was President of the Hungarian Olympic Committee (MOB) between 20 November 2010 and 2 May 2017.

He competed at the 1988 Summer Olympics in Seoul, where he won a gold medal in pommel horse. He won a gold medal in pommel horse and a bronze medal in the horizontal bars at the 1987 World Artistic Gymnastics Championships in Rotterdam.

Sports executive
Borkai became a member of the Hungarian Olympic Committee (MOB) in May 1989. He was elected to its Athletic Committee in September 1989. He was elected to the presidium of the Hungarian Gymnastics Federation in 1996. He became vice-chair of the West Transdanubian Regional Youth Council in 1999. He functioned as Chairperson of the Sport Committee of Győr-Moson-Sopron County from 1999 to 2002. He was elected one of the vice-presidents of the MOB in 2009. He also served as social president of Győri Audi ETO KC until May 2011.

Borkai served as President of the Hungarian Olympic Committee from 20 November 2010 to 2 May 2017, replacing Pál Schmitt. In June 2015, Budapest decided to bid for the 2024 Summer Olympics. The MOB has unanimously voted in support of the Olympic bid. Borkai argued the MOB established a professional body to examine Hungary's chances of submitting an Olympic bid after the IOC adopted the Olympic Agenda 2020. After political disagreements, however, Budapest withdrew its bid in March 2017.

Due to its relatively poor result at the 2016 Summer Olympics, the government of Viktor Orbán amended the Sports Act in November 2016, reorganizing the sports management in Hungary. Under this, the MOB lost its influence, fund distribution role, the coordination of the sports school program, the training of the youth and the education of the sports experts, which were taken by the Secretary of Sports within the Ministry of Human Resources. There were critics from the government that Borkai performed his tasks through voluntary work beside the primary of mayor of Győr. Borkai was replaced as President by Krisztián Kulcsár on 2 May 2017. Due to his huge sex and corruption scandal (see below), he was expelled from the Hungarian Olympic Committee on 21 October 2019.

Political career
With the rank of lieutenant-colonel, Borkai was headmaster of Béri Balogh Ádám Military Secondary School and College from 1999 to 2006 (he was already a teacher there since 1992). He entered the 2006 Hungarian local elections as the candidate of Fidesz for the mayor of Győr where he gained victory and then re-elected in 2010, 2014, and 2019. Borkai was also a Member of Parliament for Győr (Constituency III, Győr-Moson-Sopron County) between 2010 and 2014. He worked in the Defense and Law Enforcement Committee.

In August 2010, the newly formed Fidesz government, led by Viktor Orbán amended the Constitution. It ruled that members of the law enforcement or armed forces may not engage in political activity or membership and forbade them to run as candidates in elections for 3 years after having terminated service. The original proposal suggested a 5-year interval. As Zsolt Borkai, then also a lieutenant-colonel of the Hungarian Defence Forces, would also fall under this category, the government reduced it to three years. Therefore, critics and opposition parties called the amendment as "lex Borkai". As a result, Borkai could run as mayoral candidate in the Autumn 2010 Hungarian local elections. Borkai said he was not sure that the text of the constitutional amendment had been rewritten for him, but if so, he considered it as an honor.

Controversy
Shortly before the 2019 Hungarian local elections, he became a subject of controversy because an anonymous blogger released a video in which Borkai is seen having an extramarital affair with a young woman on a yacht with numerous others which showed hints at drug use supposedly somewhere on the Adriatic Sea. Subsequently, other posts released on the same blog alleged that this type of orgy and cocaine use was a common routine for Borkai, and furthermore, he was linked to a widespread corruption scandal as well on the blog. In response to these issues, Borkai acknowledged that he was present at the event seen on the disclosed materials and apologized for his behavior, but denied the accusations of corruption and drug use.

Despite him being able to have himself re-elected by a narrow margin of only 641 votes during the 2019 Hungarian local elections, the incident may have been negatively impacted the election results of Fidesz nationwide. Two days after his re-election, he announced that he had left Fidesz and that from there on he wanted to carry on his job as independent mayor of Győr . However, less than a month after his re-election, Borkai announced his resignation even as mayor in an open letter to the people of Győr on 6 November 2019, effective on 8 November after the inaugural meeting of the city's General Assembly.

Personal life
Borkai is married since 1989, his wife is educator Myrtill Havassy. They have two children, Petra (born 1992) and Ádám (born 1995).

References

External links

 
 
 

1965 births
Living people
Hungarian male artistic gymnasts
Gymnasts at the 1988 Summer Olympics
Olympic gymnasts of Hungary
Olympic gold medalists for Hungary
Olympic medalists in gymnastics
European champions in gymnastics
Hungarian sportsperson-politicians
Fidesz politicians
Members of the National Assembly of Hungary (2010–2014)
Medalists at the 1988 Summer Olympics
Medalists at the World Artistic Gymnastics Championships
Mayors of places in Hungary